Mariah Gale (born c.1980) is a British actress of film, stage and television.

Early life
She was born in Australia to an Australian mother and British father, both architects. She grew up in England. She studied at Birmingham University and the Guildhall School of Music and Drama.

Career
Gale was a member of The Royal Shakespeare Company's 2009–2011 ensemble. The critic Michael Coveney described her as "brilliant at the adolescent sulkiness of Juliet".

Awards
She won the 2006 Ian Charleson Award for her performances in Twelfth Night and 'Tis Pity She's a Whore.

Credits
Henry VI: Open Rehearsal Project, Henry VI: Rebellion, Wars of the Roses and Richard III (2022, RSC) as Margaret
The Grain Store (2009, RSC) as Masha
Doctor Who (2017) as Eliza, episode "Knock Knock"
Broadchurch (2017) as Caroline Hughes, series 3
Wendy & Peter Pan (2022, RSC) as Wendy
Father Brown (2017) as Agnes Lesser, episode 5.7 "The Smallest of Things"
Shakespeare Live! (2016, RSC and BBC2 live broadcast) as Juliet (Romeo and Juliet extract)
The Hollow Crown (2016, BBC) as Lady Bona
Wendy & Peter Pan (2015, RSC) as Wendy
Measure For Measure (2015, The Globe, London) as Isabella
Cat On A Hot Tin Roof (2014, Royal Exchange, Manchester)
Hercules: The Legend Begins (2014)
Death Comes to Pemberley (2013) as Mrs Younge
Proof (2013, Menier Chocolate Factory) as Catherine
Three Sisters (2012, Young Vic) as Olga
The Pitchfork Disney (2012, Arcola Theatre) as Hayley
Morte d'Arthur (2010, RSC) as Ettard/ Elaine of Astolat/ Morgan's gentlewoman
Romeo and Juliet (2010, RSC) as Juliet
The Grain Store (2009, RSC) as Masha
Hamlet (2009, TV) as Ophelia
The Comedy of Errors (2009, RSC) as a courtesan
As You Like It (2009, RSC) as Celia (understudying Rosalind)
The Diary of Anne Frank (2009, TV series) as Bep Voskuijl
Hamlet (2008, RSC) as Ophelia
Love's Labour's Lost (2008, RSC) as the Princess of France
A Midsummer Night's Dream (2008, RSC) as 1st Fairy
Skins (2008, TV series) guest starring as Polly
The Sea (2008, Theatre Royal, Haymarket) as Rose
Oliver Twist (2007, miniseries) as Agnes Fleming
Mad King Ludwig (2007, Rose Bruford) (rehearsed reading) as Henriette/ Cosima Wagner
Vernon God Little (2007, Young Vic Theatre) as Talyor/ Ella
Professor Bernhardi (2007, BBC Radio 3) as Nurse Ludmilla
Regime Change (2007, BBC Radio 3) as Natascha
The Tempest (2006–7, RSC) as Miranda
Julius Caesar (2006, RSC) as Portia
Antony and Cleopatra (2006–7, RSC) as Octavia
Passion and Politics (2005, Young Vic) (rehearsed reading)
'Tis Pity She's a Whore (2005, Southwark Playhouse) as Annabella
Cymbeline (2005, Regent's Park open-air theatre)
Twelfth Night (2005, Regent's Park open-air theatre) as Viola
Musik (2005, Arcola Theatre) as Klara
Professor Bernhardi (2005, Arcola Theatre) as Nurse Ludmilla
The Night (2005, BBC Radio 3) (poetry reading)
Much Ado About Nothing (2004, Shakespeare's Globe) as Hero
The Lost Child (2003–04, Chichester Festival Theatre)
Stealing Sweets and Punching People (2003, Latchmere Theatre) as Emily
Loveplay (2003, Finborough Theatre)
Broken (2000, Hen & Chickens Theatre)

References

External links

1980s births
Living people
Alumni of the University of Birmingham
Alumni of the Guildhall School of Music and Drama
Critics' Circle Theatre Award winners
Ian Charleson Award winners
English stage actresses
English television actresses
English film actresses
Royal Shakespeare Company members
21st-century British actresses